SH2B adapter protein 1 is a protein that in humans is encoded by the SH2B1 gene.

Interactions 

SH2B1 has been shown to interact with:
 Grb2, 
 Insulin receptor, 
 Janus kinase 2, and
 TrkA.

Clinical significance 

Variations close to or in the SH2B1 gene have been found to associate with obesity in two very large genome wide association studies of body mass index (BMI). Furthermore, SH2B1 deletions are associated with severe early-onset obesity.

See also 
 Genetics of obesity

References

Further reading